Chenar-e Pain (also Romanized as Chenār-e Pā’īn; also known as Chenār-e Soflá, Chenār Soflá Do, Chenār-e Soflá Āzādbakht, and Chenāreh) is a village in Kuhdasht-e Jonubi Rural District, in the Central District of Kuhdasht County, Lorestan Province, Iran. At the 2006 census, its population was 496, in 81 families.

References 

Towns and villages in Kuhdasht County